"Butterfly Tree/Vital Signs" is the third single by the Austrian rock band Excuse Me Moses. It was released on May 11, 2007, and peaked #20 in the Ö3 Austria Top 40. It is their second single which was able to reach the charts after "Summer Sun" in 2006. The single was produced by Alexander Kahr, who was also successful with the Austrian music acts Christina Stürmer and Luttenberger*Klug.

Music video 
In the music video of "Butterfly Tree", the band is sitting near some digs, playing the song with acoustic guitars. In between those sequences, there are some images of a barbecue-like party with some friends.

Maxi CD 
 "Butterfly Tree"
 "Vital Signs"
 "Butterfly Tree" (Karaoke Version)
 "Vital Signs" (Karaoke Version)

Charts

References 

2007 singles
Austrian rock songs
2007 songs